The Victoria Cross (VC) is a military decoration awarded for valour "in the face of the enemy" to members of armed forces of some Commonwealth countries and previous British Empire territories. It takes precedence over all other Orders, decorations and medals; it may be awarded to a person of any rank in any service and to civilians under military command. The award was officially constituted when Queen Victoria issued a warrant under the Royal sign-manual on 29 January 1856 that was gazetted on 5 February 1856. The order was backdated to 1854 to recognise acts of valour during the Crimean War. The first awards ceremony was held on 26 June 1857, where Queen Victoria invested 62 of the 111 Crimean recipients in a ceremony in Hyde Park.

The Victoria Cross was awarded 182 times to 181 recipients for action in the Second World War. The war, also known as World War II (WWII), was a global military conflict that involved a majority of the world's nations, including all of the great powers, organised into two opposing military alliances: the Allies and the Axis. The war involved the mobilisation of more than 100 million military personnel, making it the most widespread war in history. In a state of "total war", the major participants placed their entire economic, industrial, and scientific capabilities at the service of the war effort, erasing the distinction between civilian and military resources. Throughout the six-year duration of the war, weapons and technology improved rapidly, including the use of jet aircraft, radar and nuclear weapons. More than 70 million people, the majority of whom were civilians, were killed, making it the deadliest conflict in human history.

The start of the war is generally held to be 1 September 1939, with the German invasion of Poland and subsequent declarations of war on Germany by most of the Crown Colonies of the British Empire and Commonwealth, and by France. The first Victoria Cross of the war was awarded to Gerard Roope for action whilst in command of HMS Glowworm (although not gazetted until 1945). The war at sea began immediately after war was declared with the Battle of the Atlantic, in which German U-boats attempted to disrupt and destroy allied convoys. Throughout the war the Royal Navy was tasked with guarding vital shipping lanes and enabling amphibious operations across the globe; the St Nazaire Raid saw five Victoria Crosses awarded. The Battle of the Mediterranean was fought throughout the war and included the Battle of Taranto and Battle of Matapan, as well as protecting convoys including the Malta convoys. In total, 23 servicemen from the Royal Navy were awarded the Victoria Cross including one Royal Marine. Aerial warfare came into its own in World War II with several distinct roles emerging. The role of fighter planes developed during the Battle of Britain, where the Royal Air Force fought for air superiority against the Luftwaffe. The Battle of Britain was the first major campaign to be fought entirely by air forces. It was the largest and most sustained bombing campaign until that date. Initially, RAF airfields were attacked, however as the battle progressed, operations were extended to the strategic level with The Blitz. Britain also conducted controversial strategic bombing campaigns in Europe and Asia; they involved hundreds of aircraft dropping tens of thousands of tons of munitions over a single city. Tactical strikes were also carried out by the RAF including Operation Chastise, where No. 617 Squadron RAF attacked German dams in the Ruhr valley using "bouncing bombs"; Guy Gibson was awarded the Victoria Cross for this action.

The war on the land did not begin until May 1940, as Britain and France were involved in a Phoney War between Germany and the Franco-British alliance. The phoney war ended with the Battle of France where Germany invaded Benelux and subsequently France, which forced British troops to escape from Dunkirk. In 1941, war spread to the Middle East and North Africa as well as the East African Campaign. The United States officially joined the war in December 1941 after the Japanese Attack on Pearl Harbor. In 1942, British forces under Lieutenant General Bernard Montgomery defeated the Axis forces of General Erwin Rommel in the Second Battle of El Alamein, which marked a major turning point in the Western Desert campaign and the North African campaign. It ended Axis hopes of occupying Egypt, taking control of the Suez Canal, and gaining access to the Middle Eastern oil fields. Nine VCs were awarded for action in the Western Desert Campaign. By 1943, the war was being fought in several theatres, including the Pacific, North Africa and Southeast Asia. The Burma campaign of the Pacific War took place from 1942 to 1945, and saw 29 Victoria Crosses awarded. By 1944 and the Allied invasion of Normandy, the Allies were making ground in several theatres including advances in the Burma campaign. In Europe, the unsuccessful raid on Arnhem saw five soldiers awarded the Victoria Cross, four posthumously. In May 1945, the Allies accepted the unconditional surrender of German forces, celebrated with VE Day.  Actions after VE Day until the war in the Pacific was ended with the surrender of Japan on board USS Missouri on 2 September 1945. saw seven Commonwealth servicemen awarded the VC.

Charles Upham received the Victoria Cross and Bar; two awards for two acts. Upham was only the third recipient of the Victoria Cross and Bar, and the first for combatant actions; the previous two recipients were medical officers of the Royal Army Medical Corps.

Of the 181 recipients 85 (46.96%) were awarded posthumously.

Recipients

Notes
 A Victoria Cross was awarded for actions during air combat.
 B This was a Bar to the Victoria Cross
 C Recipient died of their wounds
 D Recipient awarded the Victoria Cross for an extended period of sustained courage and outstanding leadership, rather than a single act of valour.
 E Gibson was awarded the Victoria Cross primarily for the raid, but also for leadership and valour demonstrated as master bomber on many previous sorties.
 F Newton was captured by Japanese Forces and beheaded 11 days later.
 G  Sergeant H.V. Turner, Subedar Netrabahadur Thapa, Naik Agansing Rai and Rifleman Ganju Lama won their VCs in combat in the state of Manipur in India but the citations wrongly referred to the locations as being in Burma. These errors have been rectified in the list above.

References
General
 
 
 
 

Specific

World War II